Perfect 10 may refer to:
 Perfect 10 (film), 2019 British film by Eva Riley
 Perfect 10 (gymnastics), formerly the maximum possible score in the sport
 Perfect 10 (magazine), adult website and former men's magazine
 Perfect Ten (album), and its title song, by American record producer Mustard
 "Perfect 10" (song), by The Beautiful South
 The Perfect 10 (NFL film), 2023 sports documentary film by Steve Trout
 Former name for 987FM, a Singaporean radio station
 "The Perfect 10", the nickname of Tye Dillinger

See also
 10 (film), 1979 American romantic comedy
Perfect score (disambiguation)